Bruno Óscar Casanova (born 10 August 1984) is an Argentine football midfielder.

Club career

Chengdu Blades
Casanova transferred to Chinese club Chengdu Blades at March 2011.

References

External links

1984 births
Living people
Argentine footballers
C.D. Cuenca footballers
Expatriate footballers in Ecuador
Association football midfielders
Footballers from Santa Fe, Argentina